English Wesleyan Mission (also known as a Wesleyan Missionary Society) was a British Methodist missionary society that was involved in sending workers to countries such as New Zealand in the 19th century and  China during the late Qing Dynasty.

Mission to New Zealand
The Reverend Samuel Leigh visited New Zealand from Sydney and on his return to England he proposed to the Missionary Society that a mission should be established in New Zealand.  In February 1823 he arrived with William White and James Stack in Whangaroa Harbour and established Wesleydale, the Wesleyan mission at Kaeo, which is inland from the Whangaroa Harbour. John Hobbs and Nathaniel Turner arrived in Whangaroa Harbour in August 1823 with the Revd. Samuel Marsden, a Church Missionary Society (CMS), member who assisted the Wesleyan mission purchase land from the local Māori.

In 1826 Hongi Hika, a Māori rangatira (chief) and war leader of the Ngāpuhi iwi (tribe), moved to conquer Whangaroa.  On 10 January 1827 a party of his warriors, without his knowledge, ransacked Wesleydale. The missionaries sought refuge at the CMS mission in Paihia and the Wesleydale mission was abandoned.

In 1827 John Hobbs and James Stack established a new mission at Manganugnu, in the Hokianga. Between 1840 and 1845, the missionaries established further mission stations on the west coast of the North Island, including at Aotea, New Plymouth and Waimate, (South Taranaki). In 1846 there were 14 mission stations with 17 missionaries, 345 native helpers, 2,960 church members, and 4,834 children at school.

Mission to China
The Wesleyan Missionary Society sent out Revs. W. R. Beach and J. Cox to Guangzhou in 1852. It afterwards established itself in Hankow, and had its principal stations in that city and others of the province of Hupeh. Lay agency, under the direction of Rev. David Hill, was a prominent feature in the Mission at Hankow, and this Society was also trying the experiment of giving to some of its missionaries a medical training, that they might combine preaching and healing gifts in their labors. Reverend Doctors Charles Wenyon and Roderick McDonald were chief among these medical missionaries in taking up this call. In 1884 it resolved to open a college or high school in connection with their Central Mission, and the Rev. W. T. A. Barber, M.A., was appointed principal, and arrived at Hankow early in 1885. The object of the institution was to provide a liberal Western education for the sons of official and other wealthy Chinese. Attempts to purchase land for the erection of a suitable building were unsuccessful, but in 1887 a large house was rented in the main street of Wuchang, and the work begun. A ladies auxiliary society also sent out female workers. In 1890 there were twenty-five missionaries at work, with six lady agents, two ordained native pastors, thirty-three unordained native helpers, and nine hundred and seventy-five communicants.

See also
 List of Protestant missionary societies in China (1807–1953)
 Timeline of Chinese history
 Protestant missions in China
 List of Protestant missionaries in China
 Christianity in China

Notes

References
 
 

Christian missionary societies
Christian missions in China
British expatriates in China
English Methodist missionaries
Religious organizations established in 1852
1852 establishments in China